Strawtown is an unincorporated community in White River Township, Hamilton County, Indiana.

History
Strawtown was once an Indian village, but was laid out by white settlers in 1819 to serve travelers.  Situated on the Conner Trail which connected the cities of Cincinnati and Indianapolis, it served as the halfway point between Anderson and Indianapolis.  Strawtown was  officially platted by Bicknell Cole and William Conner in 1836.

The area was possibly named after a native Delaware chief named Straw or Strawbridge.  Indian Strawtown was located across the river  to the east and north of present-day Strawtown. Miami and Shawnee tribes invited the Delaware to settle in the White River basin after a 1795 treaty. Indian Strawtown was one of 14 Delaware villages established along the West Fork of the river.

The following year, five Strawtown settlers went to the Brookville land office and purchased tracts at that price. By 1836, roughly 30 families had purchased land in this area.

A post office was opened in 1834 and closed in 1902. It was originally established upstream in Stevensburg on October 13, 1829, as one of the earliest posts in the territory.

William Foster’s saw mill was established two miles (3 km) downstream in what is now Clare. Lumber was bound and floated like a raft down towards Noblesville and Indianapolis.

Doctor Amos Palmer organized and taught the first school in Strawtown during the winter of 1822-23. The county was separated into two equal townships in 1823, White River to the north and Delaware to the south. Rapid growth, spurred partly by the state’s plans to run the Central Canal  through Strawtown, caused the creation of seven additional townships. The canal in that area never materialized and growth stagnated, thanks in part to the location of the nearest railway four miles to the west.

Archaeology
Strawtown is the site of a current archaeological dig, funded through Indiana University – Purdue University Fort Wayne (IPFW) by the National Science Foundation. The Archaeological Survey of IPFW received a $10,000 grant for a two-week educational archaeology program at the   Strawtown Koteewi Park near Noblesville in Hamilton County. The project will also result in a National Register nomination for a site near the Strawtown enclosure. During the past six years, IPFW has worked with the Hamilton County Parks Department to assess and explore the unique archaeological heritage of the  park. The goals of this project are to clarify the Late Prehistoric population dynamics of central Indiana, create a cultural and educational resource at the park for central Indiana, and develop the archaeological resources of the park as a destination for regional tourism.

Geography
It is bounded to the north and west by the White River.

References

Unincorporated communities in Hamilton County, Indiana
Unincorporated communities in Indiana
Indianapolis metropolitan area